Kishingi Railway Station (Balochi: کیشنگی ریلوے اسٹیشن) is  located in  Pakistan.

See also
 List of railway stations in Pakistan
 Pakistan Railways

References

External links

Railway stations in Balochistan, Pakistan
Railway stations on Quetta–Taftan Railway Line